This first tour undertaken by England to South Africa was organised with a demanding schedule, although with only one Test Match. Within two weeks and three days, seven matches were to be played, the first four at sea level, and the final three, including the Test Match, at the altitude in the highveld with only two days to acclimatise before a demanding fixture against Northern Transvaal. From the outset, under captain John Pullin and the management of Alec Lewis and John Elders, there was a buoyant and optimistic spirit in the squad, as if they were determined to erase the memories of the last few seasons of undistinguished English performances.

Matches
Scores and results list England's points tally first.

Test Match

Piet Greyling led a combination of Springboks who seemed hopelessly unsure of themselves. Dawie Snyman collected all the South African points with three penalties while England, with unspectacular competence, grabbed every scoring chance. Fullback Sam Doble converted a try by wing Alan Morley and also booted four penalties.

Touring party

Manager: Alec Lewis
Assistant Manager: John Elders
Captain: John Pullin (Bristol) 24 caps

Full Backs
Sam Doble (Moseley) No caps
David Whibley (Leicester) No caps

Three-Quarters
Jeremy Janion (Bedford) 8 caps
Peter Knight (Bristol) 2 caps
Alan Morley (Bristol) No caps
Peter Preece (Coventry) No caps
Tony Richards (Fylde) No caps
John Spencer (Headingley) 15 caps

Half-Backs
Alan Old (Middlesbrough) 4 caps
Tom Palmer (Gloucester) No caps
Lionel Weston (West of Scotland) 2 caps
Jan Webster (Moseley) 2 caps
Steve Smith (Wilmslow) No caps (Replacement for L. E. Weston)

Forwards
John Barton (Coventry) 4 caps
Tony Boddy (Metropolitan Police) No caps
Mike Burton (Gloucester) 4 caps
Fran Cotton (Loughborough College) 3 caps
Tim Cowell (Rugby) No caps
Peter Larter (Northampton) 21 caps
Tony Neary (Broughton Park) 4 caps
John Pullin (Bristol) 24 caps
Chris Ralston (Richmond) 6 caps
Andy Ripley (Rosslyn Park) 4 caps
Stack Stevens (Harlequins) 9 caps
John Watkins (Gloucester) No caps
Dave Watt (Bristol) 4 caps

See also
History of rugby union matches between England and South Africa

References

1972 rugby union tours
1972
1972 in South African rugby union
1971–72 in English rugby union
Sports scandals in England
Rugby union and apartheid